Wynnewood Road station is a SEPTA rapid transit station in Haverford Township, Pennsylvania. It serves the Norristown High Speed Line (Route 100) and is located at Eagle and Haverford Roads. Both local trains and Hughes Park Express trains stop at Wynnewood Road. The station has off-street parking and an accessible platform.

Station layout

External links

 Wynnewood Road (Eagle Road) entrance from Google Maps Street View

SEPTA Norristown High Speed Line stations